The Simón Bolívar University (Universidad Simón Bolívar in Spanish) or USB, is a public institution divided in two branches, one in Miranda state and one in Vargas state, with scientific and technological orientation. The Simón Bolívar University is arguably the most prestigious science and technology university in Venezuela and one of the most important ones in South America. It is the most selective higher education school in the country admitting only the 95th percentile of its standardized admission test.

The university began academic activities in 1970 in the Sartenejas Valley in Caracas and seven years later in Camurí Grande Valley, Vargas. Currently has these two locations. Its rectory is Sartenejas headquarters, located in the Baruta municipality of Miranda state.

The USB has graduated approximately 25,000 engineers, architects, urban planners and graduates, along with 5,000 specialists, masters and doctors.

According to a research by the QS World University Rankings 2015, the USB has the No. 2 position nationally, while ranked No. 34 in Latin America.

History
In May 1967 the government created a commission composed by Luis Manuel Peñalver, Luis Carbonell, Mercedes Fermín, Miguel Angel Pérez and Héctor Isava to study the possibility of creating a new university that would offer studies to directly promote the economic and social development of the country. On July 18, 1967, the President of Venezuela Raúl Leoni signed a decree which officially founded the university as an Instituto Experimental de Educación Superior focused mainly on scientific and technological research. The original name given to the university was Universidad de Caracas; however, the first name of the Central University of Venezuela was also "Universidad de Caracas" and it was still known by that name. Members of The National Academy of History, the Bolivarian Society of Venezuela and other important institutions expressed their wish to relate the name of El Libertador Simón Bolívar to the name of the recently created university, which resulted in the change to the name of Universidad Experimental Simón Bolívar in 1969. Ernesto Mayz Vallenilla was the rector when president Rafael Caldera inaugurated the University on 19 January 1970.

From the confluence between the name "Universidad Simón Bolívar" and its slogan "The University of the Future", the Venezuelan designer, Gerd Leufert developed the design inspired by the photographic reproduction of an electrical circuit. The figure includes eight semicircular lines and a small rectangle in the center of them, forming a structure similar to a rounded pyramid, whose meaning is that of a gateway, which represents the unity of various knowledge and their projections into the future.

In 2010, in the dawn of the election day of the parliamentary elections, security forces raided a call center set up by Voto Joven that had been installed in the university, entering with firearms and taking three computers, without a search warrant and violating the university autonomy.

As of 2010, Simón Bolívar University has over 38,000 alumni

Campus

Location 

The closed-campus-style grounds are located in the Sartenejas valley, in the municipality of Baruta, Miranda State. Its total surface is approximately of 3,489,000 m2.

Library 
The Simón Bolívar University Library (USB) is an academic library with special emphasis on sciences, mathematics, engineering, and humanities.

The library of the USB has, among its special collections, the  archive. His archive includes the books of his personal Library, in addition to his own philosophical works as professor and researcher. The archive has a particular relevance within the university, not only because Mayz Vallenilla was its founder dean, but because he devoted a large part of his philosophical research to the understanding of the modern human being within the context of metatechnics. Concept that he developed witnessing the profound changes and advances in computer science and forecasting the possibilities of artificial intelligence. His book, The Foundations of Meta-Technics, sought to capture an understanding of a trans-human logic and, with it, of a new human identity for the XXI century.

In Recent years the lack of resources contribute to  deteriorate the infraestructure.

In September 2021 the professor Alejandro Teruel resigned to the Dean position.

Degrees

It offers the following undergraduate programs (BSc):
 College of Sciences:
Biology
Mathematics
Physics
Chemistry
 College Architecture and Urbanism:
Architecture
Urban Planning
 College of Engineering:
Geophysics
Electrical
Electronics
Computer
Maintenance
Mechanical
Chemical
Production (Industrial)
Materials
Telecommunications
 Associate degrees:
Electrical
Electronics
Mechanical
Aeronautic maintenance
Hotel Administration
Tourism Administration
Transport Administration
Customs Administration
Foreign Trade
Organization Management

It offers the following graduate programs (MSc, PhD and Specializations):
 College of Applied Sciences:
MSc and PhD in Biology
MSc and PhD in Computer Sciences
PhD in Interdisciplinary Science
MSc and PhD in Physics
MSc and PhD in Mathematics
MSc and PhD in Chemistry
MSc and PhD in Nutrition
MSc and PhD in Food Science
Specialization in Clinic Nutrition
Specialization in Quality Control and Evaluation of the Food Industry
 College of Engineering and Technology:
PhD in Engineering
MSc in Statistics
Specialization in computational statistics
Specialization in Telecommunications
Specialization in Telecommunication Management
MSc in Biomedicine Engineering
MSc in Electronic Engineering
Specialization in Telematics
Specialization in Electricity distribution
Specialization in Electric Installations
Specialization in Power Systems
Specialization in Electric Energy Transmission
MSc in Electric Engineering
MSc in Earth Sciences
MSc in Mechanical Engineering
Specialization in Manufacturing and Maintenance
Specialization in Design and Industrial Maintenance
Specialization in Structural Engineering
Specialization in Geotechnical Engineering
Specialization in Plant Processes Engineering
Specialization in Industrial Systems
Specialization in Rotary Equipment
MSc in Chemical Engineering
MSc in Material Engineering
MSc in Systems Engineering
 College of Social and Humanistic Sciences:
 MSc and PhD in Political Science
Specialization in Public Opinion and Political Communication
Specialization in Environment Management
MSc in Environment Development
PhD in Sustainable development
MSc in College Education
Specialization in Informative Education
Specialization in Public Transportation
MSc in Public Transportation
MSc and PhD in Philosophy
Minor in Philosophy
MSc in Business and Administration
Specialization in Project Management
Specialization in Organizational Development
Specialization in State Audit Management
Specialization in Finance Management
Specialization in Market Management
Specialization in Business Management
Specialization in Technology Management
Specialization in Natural Gas Business Management
Specialization in English
Specialization in Math Teaching for High School Level
MSc in Applied Languages
PhD in Literature
MSc in Latin American Literature
MSc in Music
MSc in Psychology

Extracurricular activities

The university fosters a thriving environment for extracurricular activities. Its student clubs are the origin of the most awarded Latin American teams in international competitions. The Model of United Nations team is one of the best in the world. The Harvard National Model of United Nations team has the most "Best International 
Delegation" Awards in the history of the conference (5 times), the World Model of United Nations team has won the "Best Large delegation award" 3 times. The Baja SAE has ranked top 5 during 10 continuous years.

The student clubs are very organized and disciplined teams. They typically have strict admission processes and put a strong focus on hard work and commitment.

Traditions 

Several myths and legends are part of the student's culture:

La Cebolla: The logo of the university is called "La Cebolla" or "the onion" in Spanish in contrast to its technological symbolism (it was inspired by the photograph of an electric circuit). It was designed to represent a group of doors one into another, a metaphor for the hard work  and effort students have to do in order to walk from the big door that leads them in, to the little one that leads them out (see ).

A brief history and description:The sculpture creation started in 1975 when Gabriel Martin Landrove, a USB architect student, won an institutional contest. Construction took place until July 5, 1991, when Phd Professor Stefan Zarea conducted the final works and inaugurated it. The artistic concept was inspired by the morning dew condensed over a tree sleeve falling down into another one. The sleeves are represented with 576 metal trowels arranged as a 48 by12 matrix in a conical truncated structure that allows the water to create multiple small waterfalls. This huge structure can rotate over its own vertical axis and the movement is produced by a pelton wheel dispose at the lower level of the conical structure. The rise of the water to the top and its rotational momentum is produced by hydraulic force drive by an electrical pump. There is also a tree level shallow pool, a top circular viewer and an intricate circular walk sides that complements the design.

The university turns it on during special occasions, like graduations, and since 2008 is under heavy maintenance program. On January 19, 2010, the maintenance department finished the second stage of its restoration with the restart of the conical structure including their rotational movement. It is left for the close future, the restoration of the mirror pools, water filtration systems and night illumination.

Notable faculty
 Marisol Aguilera, researcher, professor

References

External links 

 Spanish Wikipedia article
 Universidad Simón Bolívar
 Alumni Web Site
 LaSimonTV
 El Ampere Online, Unofficial Universidad Simón Bolívar Alumni Site
 USB Solar Venezuela, first solar car team in Venezuela
 USB Fire Department
 USB HNMUN Delegation
 USB WORLDMUN Delegation
 USB LAMUN Delegation
 Interactive Map of Sartenejas Campus
 https://www.youtube.com/watch?v=EhnGmfkFh3Q
 https://www.youtube.com/watch?v=qNevGd0pTYQ

Aerial Photos
Campus Image from Google Maps

Simon Bolivar, Universidad
Educational institutions established in 1967
Baruta Municipality
1967 establishments in Venezuela